Jeanne Bouvier (11 February 1865 – 1964) is remembered as a French textile worker, feminist, and militant trade unionist.

Early life and education

Born in 1865 in Salaise-sur-Sanne, Isère, she was the daughter of Marcel Bouvier and Louise Grenouiller. The family moved to Saint-Rambert-d'Albon, Drôme, when Bouvier was 16 months old. She had a sister and there was a brother who died of measles. As a child, Bouvier helped her mother work in the fields and guard the cows. At the age of ten years, Bouvier was sent to board at a religious school in Épinouze where she was a good student.

Career
When she was eleven, the family moved again and settled in Saint-Symphorien-d'Ozon, Rhône, and she became a silk factory worker.

After 1840 it was illegal for French children under the age of 12 to work more than an eight-hour day, but Bouvier worked in one of the many factories that ignored the law and she would work thirteen hours. The wages were poor and she and her mother would go without food. Her mother would blame her for being so lazy that her employers did not pay her more. Bouvier changed employers to get better wages and  the family moved several times, with Bouvier specializing in textile work.

Bouvier was appointed technical advisor and served as an active delegate to the first International Congress of Workers at the first International Labour Conference held in Washington, D.C. in 1919. She was a member of the Women's Employment Committee and participated in various International Congresses of Working Women, including the 1921 congress in Geneva. From 1919 to 1935, she was a member of the Joint Committee for Unemployment Fund. In April 1922, after 27 years of affiliation, she was forced to leave the union.

Selected works
Deux époques. Deux hommes. Les sauveurs de l'Économie nationale, Paris, Radot, 1927
La Lingerie et les Lingères, Paris, Gaston Doin et Cie éditeurs, 1928
Histoire des dames employées dans les postes, télégraphes et téléphones de 1714-1919, Paris-Saint-Amand, les Presses universitaires de France, 1930
Les Femmes pendant la Révolution. Leur action politique, sociale, économique, militaire, leur courage devant l'échafaud, Paris, Eugène Figuière, 1931
Mes mémoires, ou, 59 années d'activité industrielle, sociale et intellectuelle d'un ouvrière, Poitiers, l'Action intellectuelle; 1936

References

1865 births
1964 deaths
People from Isère
French feminist writers
20th-century French writers
French trade unionists
French women trade unionists
French socialist feminists
20th-century French women